The 13th School Group was a unit of the United States Army Air Corps.  It was last assigned to the 24th School Wing, and was demobilized on 30 April 1931 at March Field, California. The unit was an early United States Army Air Corps flying training group, and the first major unit assigned to March Field after its re-opening in 1927.

History
During World War I, March Field was a major primary pilot training base for the Air Service, with its graduates being sent to advanced training schools before being deployed to the American Expeditionary Force in France.   The school was closed after the armistice in February 1919.

In July 1919, Congress authorized resumption of enlistment of flying cadets on a limited basis, and the school at March Field was re-opened which offered a combined ground school and primary flight training using surplus Curtiss JN-4 Jennies.  A shortage of money and failure of the training program to become as large as planned, prompted the closing of the primary school at March Field in 1921, and March became a storage depot.  In 1922 it was decided to centralize all flying training in San Antonio, Texas.

The decision by the Coolidge Administration in 1926 to expand the Air Corps found the facilities in San Antonio insufficient to accommodate the expanded  number of cadets entering primary training.  As a result, March Field was re-opened as a primary pilot training school in July 1927,  and the  13th School Group was designated to perform duties as the headquarters for the new Air Corps Primary Flying School.  Flight training was conducted in Consolidated PT-1 and PT-3s, which had taken over from the Curtiss Jennies.   There were three school squadrons assigned, along with support squadrons.

Even before the school at March opened, it was known it was a temporary unit, as plans were ongoing to expand the facilities in San Antonio.   With the opening of Randolph Field in 1931, the primary pilot training at March ended in April 1931 and March Field became the home of the new 1st Bombardment Wing.

The group was activated again in 1943, but Standard military units, based on relatively inflexible tables of organization were proving not well adapted to the training mission.  Accordingly, a more functional system was adopted in which each base was organized into a separate numbered unit. The 13th Technical School Group  was disbanded a year later when all units at Chanute Field were replaced by the 3502d Army Air Forces Base Unit.

Lineage
 Constituted as the 13th Group (School) on 6 February 1923
 Redesignated 8 March 1929 as 13th School Group
 Activated on 31 July 1927
 Disbanded on 30 April 1931
 Reconstituted and redesignated 13th Technical School Group
 Activated on 28 February 1943
 Disbanded on 30 April 1944

Assignments
 24th School Wing, 8 July 1927 – 30 April 1931
 Central Technical Training Command, 28 February 194330 April 1944

Components
 Flying Training Squadrons
 47th School Squadron, 31 July 1927 – 30 April 1931
 53d School Squadron, 31 July 1927 – 30 April 1931
 54th School Squadron, 31 July 1927 – 30 April 1931 

 Support Squadrons
 69th Service Squadron, 31 July 1927 – 30 April 1931
 70th Service Squadron, 31 July 1927 – 30 April 1931
 23d Photo Section, 31 July 1927 – 30 April 1931

Stations
 March Field, California, 31 July 1927 – 30 April 1931
 Chanute Field. Illinois, 28 February 1943 – 30 April 1944

See also

 Army Air Forces Training Command
 List of Training Section Air Service airfields
 World War I training fields of the Air Service, United States Army

References

Notes

Bibliography

 
 
 Manning, Thomas A. (2005), History of Air Education and Training Command, 1942–2002.  Office of History and Research, Headquarters, AETC, Randolph AFB, Texas 
 
 
 

Groups of the Air Service, United States Army
Military units and formations of the United States Army Air Corps
Army flying training units and formations
Military units and formations established in 1927
Military units and formations disestablished in 1931